Tim Matthys (born 23 December 1983) is a Belgian football official and a former player. As of 2019, he works as a scout with Gent.

Career
While playing for his club (Zulte Waregem), the striker scored 5 goals in the UEFA Cup in only 3 matches. Matthys scored one in the first round against FC Lokomotiv Moscow and scored a hat-trick against Austria Wien. He is the best scorer of his team in this competition. He also scored in the Belgian Cup final, which allowed S.V. Zulte-Waregem entry into the UEFA Cup.

Matthys previously played for Panthrakikos in the Greek Super League.

He previously played for Mons in the Belgian Pro League (D1). Tim arrived at Mons in August 2010 and helped the team in their promotion quest by winning the Tour Final of the Belgian second division (Exqi League). At the end of his first season, he was elected "Man of the Season" by his club.

Later career
Retiring in the summer 2019, 35-year old Matthys was hired as chief scout for KV Mechelen. On 1 October 2019, he returned to K.A.A. Gent and was appointed scout for the first team and he would also take coordinating tasks for the U18 and U21 teams of the club.

Honours
Zulte Waregem
 Belgian Cup: 2005–06

Mechelen
 Belgian Cup: 2018–19

References

External links
 

1983 births
Living people
Belgian footballers
Belgian expatriate footballers
Expatriate footballers in Greece
Belgian Pro League players
Challenger Pro League players
Super League Greece players
K.A.A. Gent players
S.V. Zulte Waregem players
Panthrakikos F.C. players
Lierse S.K. players
R.A.E.C. Mons players
K.V. Mechelen players
Footballers from Ghent
Association football forwards